Parliament Street may refer to:
Parliament Street, Exeter, one of the world's narrowest streets in Exeter, England
The southern extension of Whitehall in London, leading to Parliament Square and the Parliament of the United Kingdom
The start of the A562 road in Toxteth, Liverpool
Parliament Street (Toronto), a street in Toronto, Canada running east of downtown from the Harbour to Bloor Street
Parliament Street (Dublin), a street in the Irish capital that runs from Dame Street to the Liffey quays. 
A main shopping street thoroughfare on the A61 road through Harrogate, United Kingdom
Parliament Street (York), one of the main shopping streets in York, United Kingdom
Sansad Marg, an area of New Delhi, also known as Parliament Street

Odonyms referring to a building